An escalope is traditionally a piece of boneless meat that has been thinned out using a mallet or rolling pin or beaten with the handle of a knife, or merely butterflied. The mallet breaks down the fibres in the meat, making it more tender. The meat is then coated and fried. The thinner meat cooks faster with more moisture loss.

Common sizes 
The typical sizes of an escalope used in the food industry range from 110 to 225 g (4–8 oz).

Paillard  or scallop 
Paillard is an older French culinary term referring to a quick-cooking, thinly sliced or pounded piece of meat.  In France, it has been largely replaced by the word escalope.

The cut is known as "scallop" in the US, not to be confused with the shellfish scallop.

Origin 
The term escalope originated in France. It first appeared in cookery terminology late in the 17th century as a dialectal expression in the northeast of rural France originally meaning a shelled nut or mollusk: veau à l'escalope (veal cooked in the style of an escalope). In those days, an escalope was undoubtedly always veal.

Other uses 
The term escalope is also applied to meat free products such as Quorn (Mycoprotein) Escalopes which have a cheese & broccoli sauce encased in breadcrumbs. In Australia the term escalope is also applied to potatoes that have been thinly sliced. Potatoes that are thinly sliced, battered then fried are often called "scallops".

See also 

 Cutlet
 Saltimbocca
 Scaloppine
 Wiener schnitzel
 Schnitzel
 Milanesa
 Cotoletta
 Silpancho

References

External links 
 

Meat dishes